Fürst Fugger Privatbank is a small German regional bank in Augsburg, founded in 1954 and mainly serving the Swabia region of Bavaria, with 141 employees. Its name references the historical Fugger banking house that ceased to exist in the 17th century, but the companies have no relation.

History
Fürst Fugger Privatbank was founded when Friedrich Carl Fürst Fugger-Babenhausen acquired the small bank Friedl & Dumler GmbH in 1954.  However, the bank only received its current name in 1994. Since 1999, Fürst Fugger Privatbank has been majority owned by the Nürnberger Versicherungsgruppe insurance company, although prince Hubertus Fugger-Babenhausen still holds a stake. He also owns the Fuggerhäuser in Augsburg where the bank has its main seat.

References

External links 
Fürst Fugger Privatbank Aktiengesellschaft

Banks of Germany
Companies based in Augsburg
Banks established in 1954